The Quincy Mansion , also known as the Josiah Quincy Mansion, was a summer home built by Josiah Quincy, Jr. in 1848. The mansion itself was situated where Angell Hall now stands on the campus of the Eastern Nazarene College. The mansion, once a Quincy, Massachusetts landmark, was demolished in 1969.

Architecture
The mansion, which was built in the mid-19th century, was three stories and white, in Georgian architecture, with marble fireplaces in most of the rooms and large French windows on the first floor that "opened upon either little balconies or broad piazzas." From the captain's walk of the Mansion, Wollaston Bay was clearly visible down to the "ships entering and leaving the port of Boston."

Ownership

Quincy family
The mansion was once located, along with the Josiah Quincy House and the Dorothy Quincy House on a  parcel of land known as the "Lower Farm" belonging to the Quincy family. It was built by Josiah Quincy, Jr., then-mayor of Boston, c. 1848. Elm Avenue, with its four rows of elms, had been the avenue, or driveway, for the Josiah Quincy House and the Josiah Quincy Mansion.

Quincy Mansion School
The property eventually came under the ownership of Horace Mann Willard, who established the Quincy Mansion School for Girls, a Christian, college-preparatory, and boarding school, and became principal. When Dr. Willard died in 1907, his wife took over as principal until she could no longer manage the property.

Eastern Nazarene College
At the urging of Charles J. Fowler, who knew the property was for sale, the Eastern Nazarene College moved to its current location in the Wollaston Park area of Quincy, Massachusetts, in 1919, and acquired the mansion as part of a  property that also included the classroom building called the Manchester (1896), the stables (1848) (where Memorial Hall was built in 1948), and the Canterbury (1901), which still stands today as Canterbury Hall.

The mansion, which had seen many uses and was need of costly repair, was instead torn down in 1969, three years after the creation of the National Register of Historic Places but before local buildings such as the Josiah Quincy House had been placed on it.

See also
Josiah Quincy House
Quincy Homestead
Quincy family
Eastern Nazarene College

Notes and references

External links
 Photograph of the Quincy Mansion , page 4, Quincy History, Spring 1983.

Buildings and structures demolished in 1969
Houses in Quincy, Massachusetts
Eastern Nazarene College
Quincy family homestead
Houses completed in 1848